Cheyenne South Side Historic District is a  historic district which was listed on the National Register of Historic Places in 2006.  It is roughly bounded by Warren Avenue, Russell Avenue, E. Tenth Street, and E. Fifth Street. The listing included 393 contributing buildings and 175 non-contributing ones.

It is a residential area next to Union Pacific Railway yards on the south side of Cheyenne, separated by the railroad tracks from Cheyenne's original downtown and residential areas.

References

Historic districts on the National Register of Historic Places in Wyoming
Victorian architecture in Wyoming
Cheyenne, Wyoming